Mimolochus hoefneri is a species of beetle in the family Cerambycidae, and the only species in the genus Mimolochus. The beetle is recorded to be found in Mexico. It was described by Thomson in 1865.

References

Lamiini
Beetles described in 1865